Miskovsky is a surname. Notable people with the surname include:

 Carolina Miskovsky (born 1978), Swedish musician
 Lisa Miskovsky (born 1975), Swedish-Finnish-Czech musician and singer-songwriter
 Milan C. Miskovsky (1926–2009), American CIA member